The Grangefield Academy is a secondary school with academy status situated in the heart of the borough of Stockton on Tees, on Oxbridge Avenue, Grangefield, Stockton-on-Tees, a market town in the ceremonial county of County Durham, North East England.

History
The school dates back to 1896, originating as the Stockton Higher Grade School. However the current site is that of the former Grangefield Grammar Schools, which opened on 2 November 1951. Prior to this, from 1944, it was in different buildings as the Stockton Secondary Grammar School, and before that, from 1906, as Stockton Secondary School. The boys' and girls' lessons were taught separately, with separate heads of school.

In 1973 the grammar schools were merged into the comprehensive and co-educational The Grange Comprehensive School, which operated until 1985.

In 1985, another school merged in, and the combined entity was renamed Grangefield School.  The merging school was Hardwick Secondary Modern School, founded in 1963, later known as Sheraton Comprehensive School. The new institution did not have a sixth form but was a co-educational comprehensive school of over 1000 students aged 11–16.  It became a specialist Technology College from 1999 to 2013, during which period it was named Grangefield School and Technology College.

The school undertook formal consultation about plans to re-establish itself as an academy sponsored by Northern Education Trust, a Department for Education-approved charity, and the conversion to The Grangefield Academy was finalised in early 2014.

Buildings and grounds

The Grangefield Academy is located amid extensive school fields, adjacent to the town ring road and opposite the Stockton Cricket Club Ground.

In 2016 plans were completed to rebuild the school, with a new building featuring a large sports hall, activity studio, drama studio, main hall and dining hall.

The now-demolished attractive and substantial main buildings of the old Grammar Schools that stood on the site dated from the early 1950s.  Comprising Grangefield Boys' and Grangefield Girls' Grammar Schools, the premises were connected to one another by a shared dining hall. The original brick, sandstone and Cumberland slate buildings faced out over the playing fields and were constructed around four well-planted quadrangles that provided a distinctive learning environment. The land will be used for a new car park, multi-use games area and school fields.

Before the transition to academy status many areas of the school were extensively refurbished; a new extension for the Design and Technology block was completed in 2005. Modern additions included a sports hall and library. The school field and grounds provide 11 tennis courts, 2 football pitches, 2 rugby pitches, 2 hockey pitches and 2 artificial cricket wickets.

There has been substantial investment to provide fully equipped ICT suites. Mathematics, Modern Languages and Humanities and many other subject areas have in-class ICT provision, including Art, Music, Design and Technology and Science. Many curriculum areas have access to interactive whiteboards and data projectors. The facilities are enhanced through the Grangefield Media Centre, providing state of the art ICT facilities, which is located on the school site.

The academy had had a "schools within school" ethos since its conversion to academy status in January 2014 and has divided the five year groups into schools. Year 7 is Discovery, Year 8 is Ignite, Year 9 is Innovation, Year 10 is Pioneer and Year 11 is Revolution. But now every corridor is subject specific.  Each has its own colour scheme with coloured accent walls in each year group area and a coloured 'G' on school ties; for example, Year 7’s is Orange. Year 8’s is pink. Year 9’s is purple. Year 10’s is darker pink. Finally, Year 11’s is Blue.

Academic performance
The school fell to be in the lowest quintile amongst similar schools nationally, with, in 2012, only 40% of pupils attaining at least five GCSEs grade A* to C including English and mathematics. This was a decrease of 10 percentage points since 2011. Work to improve the grades and reputation of the school began, and by 2018, GCSE results were the best ever.

Following an Ofsted inspection in December 2012, the school was placed in "Special Measures" under the Education Act 2005 because it was failing to provide an acceptable standard of education and the persons responsible for leading, managing and governing the school were not demonstrating the capacity to secure the necessary improvements in the inadequate achievements of pupils, quality of teaching, standards of behaviour, and managerial leadership. Subsequently the school had visits from Her Majesty's Inspectorate, some of which have deemed that the school was making reasonable progress, but the final inspection in 2013 determined that the school was not making enough progress towards the removal of special measures.

After conversion to Academy status, the school continued to improve and, with "Special Measures" removed, in 2018 Grangefield Academy achieved "Good" status under all five major assessment headings.

Notable former pupils

Stockton Secondary School
 Alderman Sir Charles William Allison CBE, JP, Honorary Freeman of the Borough 1956
 William Arthur Bone, combustion engineer, and Professor of Chemical Technology at Imperial College London from 1912–36
 Air Vice-Marshal John Embling CBE DSO
 Horace Maybray King, Baron Maybray-King, Labour MP for Southampton Test from 1950-5 and Southampton Itchen from 1955–71 and Speaker of the  House of Commons from 1965–71
 Peter Smithson, architect
 Prof Keith Stewartson, Goldsmid Professor of Mathematics at University College London from 1964–83
 Barry Unsworth, novelist

Grangefield Grammar School
 Pat Barker CBE, author who wrote the historical novel Regeneration
 Hugh Cameron, cyclist
 James Gaddas, actor
 Charlie Gillett, musicologist, radio presenter and writer
 David Ingman CBE, Chairman of the British Waterways Board from 1987–93
 Kate Pyne, Chief Technical Historian at the Atomic Weapons Establishment, Aldermaston, Berks
 Sir Ridley Scott, film director
 Tony Scott, film director
 Bruce Thomas, bassist in The Attractions

References

External links
 Grangefield Academy website
 EduBase
 The Old Stocktonians Association with school transition history

Northern Education Trust schools

Secondary schools in the Borough of Stockton-on-Tees
Academies in the Borough of Stockton-on-Tees
Educational institutions established in 1894
1894 establishments in England